Bungaree, or Boongaree ( – 24 November 1830), was an Aboriginal Australian from the Guringai people of the Broken Bay north of Sydney, who was known as an explorer, entertainer, and Aboriginal community leader. He is also significant in that he was the first Australian born person to be recorded in Matthew Flinders' Diary as a resourceful Australian, and the first Australian-born person to circumnavigate the Australian mainland.

Biography

When Bungaree moved to the growing settlement of Sydney in the 1790s, he established himself as a well-known identity able to move between his own people and the newcomers. In 1798 he accompanied Flinders (and his brother, Samuel Ward Flinders, a midshipman from the Reliance) on the sloop  on a coastal survey as an interpreter, guide and negotiator with local indigenous groups. Despite the lack of a common language, the indigenous people persistently sought Bungaree out to speak to instead of Flinders. His mediation skills were greatly appreciated by the Europeans with whom he shared the ship. In 1799, to reach an agreement with local people in one particular situation, Bungaree gave them a spear and a spear thrower as gifts, showing them how to use them. It is referred to by Bronwen Douglas as a "cross-cultural act, signifying a reciprocal rather than a hierarchical relationship and challenging the reified notion of 'cross-cultural' as contact between opposed, homogenized 'cultures'”, adding that "the Moreton Bay people probably took Bungaree for the leader of the expedition and the white men for his followers".

Flinders was the cartographer of the first complete map of Australia, filling in the gaps from previous cartographic expeditions, and was the most prominent advocate for naming the continent "Australia". Flinders noted that Bungaree was "a worthy and brave fellow" who, on multiple occasions, saved the expedition. Bungaree was the only indigenous Australian on the ship – and as such, played a vital diplomatic role as they made their way around the coast, overcoming not inconsiderable language barriers in places. According to historian Keith Vincent, Bungaree chose the role as a go-between, and was often able to mollify indigenous people who were about to attack the sailors, by taking off his clothes and speaking to people, despite being in territory unknown to himself. Flinders later wrote in his memoirs of Bungaree's "good disposition and open and manly conduct" and his kindness to the ship's cat, Trim.

Bungaree was also known by the titles "King of Port Jackson" and "King of the Blacks", with his principal wife, Cora Gooseberry, known as his queen.

Captain Faddei Bellingshausen referred to Bungaree's welcoming visit to the Russian exploration ship Vostok in 1820.

Bungaree spent the rest of his life ceremonially welcoming visitors to Australia, educating people about Aboriginal culture (especially boomerang throwing), and soliciting tribute, especially from ships visiting Sydney. He was also influential within his own community, taking part in corroborees, trading in fish and helping to keep the peace.

In 1828, he and his clan moved to the Governor's Domain, and were given rations, with Bungaree described as 'in the last stages of human infirmity'. He died at Garden Island on 24 November 1830 and was buried in Rose Bay. Obituaries of him were carried in the Sydney Gazette and The Australian.

By the end of his life, he had become a familiar sight in colonial Sydney, dressed in a succession of military and naval uniforms that had been given to him. His distinctive outfits and notoriety within colonial society, as well as his gift for humour and mimicry, especially his impressions of past and present governors, made him a popular subject for portrait painters, with eighteen portraits and half a dozen incidental appearances in wider landscapes or groupings of figures. His were among the first full-length oil portraits to be painted in the colony, and the first to be published as a lithograph.

Legacy

Boongaree Island, located off the Kimberley coast of Western Australia, was named after him by Captain King in 1820.
The suburb of Bongaree, Queensland, is named after him.
HMAS Bungaree, originally built in Dundee as a cargo vessel in 1937 for the Adelaide Steamship Company, but commissioned by the Royal Australian Navy after conversion into a minelayer in June 1941 at Garden Island, Sydney, was named after him.
In 2017, a Sydney Ferries Emerald-class ferry was named Bungaree.
A primary school was named Bungaree in late 1960's in the suburb of Rockingham, Western Australia.

However, Bungaree's important role in the exploration of Australia appears to have been almost forgotten. There are statues to Flinders and the cat Trim, but as at January 2019, not a single statue to Bungaree recognising his achievements.

References

Sources
 Pollon, F. (ed.) [1988] (1996). The Book of Sydney Suburbs, Angus & Robertson Publishers: Sydney. .
 Smith, Keith Vincent, (1992) King Bungaree, Kangaroo Press, Kenthurst. .

Further reading

1830 deaths
History of Indigenous Australians
1775 births
Pre-Separation Queensland
Indigenous Australian people